Joe Apoloney (1880-1952) was an Australian rugby league footballer who played in the 1900s and 1910s.  He played for Balmain and was a foundation player of the club.

Playing career
Apoloney made his first grade debut for Balmain against Western Suburbs on 20 April 1908 at Birchgrove Oval, which was the club's first ever game and also the opening week of the inaugural NSWRL competition.  Balmain went on to win the match 24–0 in front of 3000 spectators.

Apoloney played with Balmain up until the end of the 1912 before retiring.  Apoloney played representative football for New South Wales in 1909 and played 2 games for Metropolis which was the early version of the modern day NSW City team.

References

1880 births
1952 deaths
Australian rugby league players
Balmain Tigers players
New South Wales rugby league team players
Rugby league hookers
Rugby league players from Gosford, New South Wales
Rugby league props
Rugby league second-rows